Xtopia is a concept building for a 300-floor high-rise self-contained community in Shanghai, China. The concept was featured on the Discovery Channel as part of its series Mega Engineering on 25 April 2010.  The building is a hypothetical method to combat geographic urban sprawl and lower the environmental impact of populations. Xtopia features a tripod base which combats winds and ground tremors, while allowing sunlight to pass through to surrounding buildings and parks. There are industrial sections in the legs, commercial floors in the first panoramic levels, residential levels, and aeroponic gardens further up.

The Discovery Channel program was written and directed by documentary filmmaker Scott Tiffany.

The program stated that a traditional lift system wouldn't have worked in the building because it might take hours to reach the destination. A special lift system would be used, which not only would slide with the iron bars of the building in upward and downward direction, but also move sideways.

One complete floor of the building is reserved for the growth of vegetables and fruits which not only fulfill the needs of building but also of the city.

References

Buildings and structures in Shanghai